Sydney Ayres (7 August 1889 – 7 August 1974) was an Australian cricketer. He played in fourteen first-class matches for Queensland between 1913 and 1925.

See also
 List of Queensland first-class cricketers

References

External links
 

1889 births
1974 deaths
Australian cricketers
Queensland cricketers
Cricketers from Sydney